The following are a list of riots that have occurred in Northern Ireland.

References 

Riots and civil disorder in Northern Ireland